K. Saraswathi Amma (14 April 1919 – 26 December 1975) was a Malayalam feminist writer whose short stories have been anthologised in translation in several American texts. According to critic Jancy James, "In the entire history of women's writing in Kerala, Saraswathi Amma's is the most tragic case of the deliberate neglect of female genius."

Literary career

K. Saraswathi Amma's first short story was published in 1938, followed by 12 volumes of short stories, a novel, and a play. In 1958, a book of essays titled Purushanmarillatha Lokam was published. In her time she was dubbed as a 'man hater,' but later feminist scholars have celebrated her.

J. Devika in her article titled 'Beyond Kulina and Kulata: The Critique of Gender Difference in the Writings of K. Saraswati Amma', in Indian Journal of Gender Studies re-reads the writings of K. Saraswathi Amma, whom she describes "an author marginalised within the Malayalee literary universe and labelled as an incorrigible man-hater." Devika considers her paper an "effort to read her writing as an engagement with the positions taken in the debates around modern gender in the early 20th-century Malayalee public sphere."

A selection of Saraswathi Amma's fiction, some of it translated into English, was published under the title Stories from a forgotten feminist. In the foreword, Jancy James says, "In  stories she shattered women's illusions about men and about love, and bitterly attacked patriarchy and tradition, giving her the reputation of being a strident feminist."

Works 

Novel

 Premabhajanam (Darling) -  - 1944

Play
 Devaduth (Messenger of God) -1945

Short stories
 Ponnumkudam (Pot of Gold) -  - 1946
 SthreeJanmam (Born as a woman) - 1946
 Keezhjeevanakkari (Subjugatef woman)- 1949
 Kalamandiram (Temple of art) - 1949
 Penbuddhi (Women's wit) - 1951
 Kanatha Mathil (Thick wall) - 1953
 Prema Pareekshanam (Experiment of love) - 1955
 Chuvanna Pookkal (Red flowers) - 1955
 Cholamarangal (Shady trees) - 1958

Collection of essays
 Purushanmaarillatha Lokam (A World Without Men) - 1958

Posthumously published
 Stories from a forgotten feminist

References

1919 births
1975 deaths
20th-century Indian novelists
20th-century Indian women writers
Indian feminist writers
Indian women novelists
Indian women short story writers
Indian women essayists
20th-century short story writers
20th-century Indian essayists
Indian women dramatists and playwrights
20th-century Indian dramatists and playwrights
Malayalam-language writers
Women writers from Kerala
Novelists from Kerala
Dramatists and playwrights from Kerala